Council of the Americas is an American organization whose stated goal is promoting free trade and open markets throughout the Americas.

History
The group was founded in 1963 as the Business Group for Latin America by David Rockefeller, at the request of President John F. Kennedy as a means for business to fight the influence of Fidel Castro in Latin America. The Kennedy administration conceded investment guarantees, which by 1967 would cost the government $600 million in the case of Chile alone. Almost 30 corporations participated by 1965, when the Business Group was reorganized as the Council for Latin America. Since that time, membership has grown to over 200 blue chip companies that represent the majority of the U.S. private investment in Latin America.

Present

The Council hosts presidents, cabinet ministers, central bankers, government officials, and leading experts in economics, politics, business, and finance. This gives it access to information of the region.

The Council of the Americas argues that free markets and private enterprise offer the most effective means to achieve regional economic growth. It has been a supporter of free trade agreements and has been instrumental in the conception of the North American Free Trade Agreement (NAFTA) and the Central American Free Trade Agreement (CAFTA).

Further reading
Memoirs, David Rockefeller, New York: Random House, 2002.

See also
North American Free Trade Agreement (NAFTA)
Free Trade Area of the Americas

References

External links
Americas Society/Council of the Americas website
 Americas Quarterly

Institutions founded by the Rockefeller family
Trade blocs
Latin America
Politics of the Americas
International organizations based in the Americas